"Can't Get Enough" is the fourth and final single released from English rock band Suede's fourth studio album, Head Music (1999). The song was released on 8 November 1999 through Nude Records.

Background
All of the songs on the album were produced by Suede with Michael Ade except "Can't Get Enough", which was produced by Steve Osborne. The song peaked at number 23 on the UK Singles Chart but was the first Suede single not to chart in Finland or Sweden since "New Generation" in 1995.

The UK video for the song was directed by John Hillcoat, and features a couple, played by Max Beesley and Laura Fraser, trashing their apartment. An additional Australian-only version of the video was produced and directed by drummer Simon Gilbert, and is a composite of on tour B-roll footage and a live performance.

The single was released in Sweden with "Let Go" as the lead track and containing the B-sides from the first two UK CDs.

Critical reception
Music Week wrote: "[T]he Steve Osbourne-produced Can't Get Enough should see similar chart success to their previous two releases. While not as catchy, Can't Get Enough is a credible and energetic outing with some excellent guitar work and Brett Anderson's distinctive vocal." Select said "Suede's new-brand robo-pop reaches a mystifying conclusion here," and called the chorus' ambiguous lyrics "endearingly silly where once they were glorious." They added: "The B-sides show a welcome human touch beneath the metallic sheen, especially the lovely 'Since You Went Away'."

Track listings
CD1
 "Can't Get Enough" (Brett Anderson, Neil Codling)
 "Let Go" (Anderson, Codling)
 "Since You Went Away" (Anderson)

CD2
 "Can't Get Enough" (Anderson, Codling)
 "Situations" (Anderson, Codling)
 "Read My Mind" (Anderson)

CD3
 "Can't Get Enough" (Anderson, Codling)
 "Everything Will Flow" [Rollo's vocal mix] (Anderson, Richard Oakes)
 "She's in Fashion" [Lironi version] (Anderson, Codling)

Swedish CD
 "Let Go" (Anderson, Codling)
 "Can't Get Enough" (Brett Anderson, Neil Codling)
 "Since You Went Away" (Anderson)
 "Situations" (Anderson, Codling)
 "Read My Mind" (Anderson)

Charts

References

1999 singles
1999 songs
Songs written by Brett Anderson
Songs written by Neil Codling
Suede (band) songs